The 1994–95 Maltese Premier League was the 15th season of the Maltese Premier League, and the 80th season of top-tier football in Malta. It was contested by 10 teams, and Hibernians F.C. won the championship.

League standings

Results

References
 Malta - List of final tables (RSSSF)

Maltese Premier League seasons
Malta
1994–95 in Maltese football